Bidvest Insurance, a subsidiary of the Bidvest Group based in South Africa, is an authorised financial services provider in short-term insurance, specialising in personal and automotive value add insurance products. Bidvest Insurance is part of the Bidvest Financial Services division of the Bidvest Group.

History
The company was founded in 1997 as part of McCarthy Motor Holdings known as McCarthy Insurance Services
2004 Bidvest Group bought McCarthy Motor Holdings and McCarthy Insurance Services then became Bidvest Insurance falling under the Bidvest Financial Services division.

Divisions
Bidvest Insurance comprises 

 Affinity Channel
 Direct Channel

Affinity Channel
This division is a financial services provider holding a full short term insurance licence. Bidvest Insurance is a short term insurer licensed to underwrite accident & health, liability, motor, miscellaneous, property, and transport insurance.

Direct Channel

Handre Pollard's R2 million insurance
In 2015 Springbok flyhalf Handré Pollard’s kicking foot was insured by Bidvest Insurance for R2 million (ZAR) (US$230,000) during the Rugby World Cup.

Regulatory membership
Bidvest Insurance is a member of the South African Insurance Association (SAIA) and a partner member of Southern African Travel Agents (ASATA).

See also
Economy of South Africa

References

Insurance companies of South Africa
Companies based in Durban
Financial services companies established in 1997
1997 establishments in South Africa